Pagliacci is a 1931 American musical film directed by Joe W. Coffman and starring Fernando Bertini, Alba Novella and Mario Valle. It is a filmed version of a stage performance of the opera Pagliacci by Ruggero Leoncavallo.

Cast
 Fernando Bertini as Canio / Pagliaccio  
 Alba Novella as Nedda / Columbina  
 Mario Valle as Tonio / Taddeo  
 Francesco Curci as Beppe / Arlecchino  
 Giuseppe Inter rants as Silvio  
 The San Carlo Grand Opera Company as Ensemble  
 The San Carlo Symphony Orchestra as Orchestra

References

Bibliography
 Goble, Alan. The Complete Index to Literary Sources in Film. Walter de Gruyter, 1999.

External links

1931 films
1931 musical films
American musical films
1930s Italian-language films
Films based on operas
Films set in Italy
American black-and-white films
1930s American films